The 1952 Toronto Argonauts season was the 63rd season for the team since the franchise's inception in 1873. The team finished in second place in the Interprovincial Rugby Football Union with a 7–4–1 record and qualified for the playoffs for the third year in a row. The Argonauts defeated the Hamilton Tiger-Cats two games to one in the IRFU Finals before winning the Eastern Final over the Sarnia Imperials. In the first ever Grey Cup between the current incarnation of the Edmonton Eskimos franchise, Toronto won their 10th Grey Cup championship by a score of 21–11. It was their second Grey Cup win in three years and their fifth championship in the previous eight years.

Preseason

Regular season

Standings

Schedule

Postseason

Grey Cup

November 29 @ Varsity Stadium (Attendance: 27,391)

References

Toronto Argonauts seasons
Grey Cup championship seasons
1952 Canadian football season by team